Estádio Estadual Kléber José de Andrade, also known as Estádio Kléber Andrade, is a football stadium located in Cariacica, Espírito Santo, Brazil. The stadium was built in 1983 and is able to hold 21,152 people.

Estádio Kléber Andrade is owned by the Espírito Santo State Government. The stadium is named after Kléber José de Andrade, who was the president of Rio Branco AC, almost 40 time state champions of Espírito Santo, during the stadium construction.

History
In the 1970s, Rio Branco closed down its stadium, Estádio Governador Bley, which had a maximum capacity of approximately 15,000 people. The new stadium construction started some time after that.

In 1983, the works on Estádio Kléber Andrade were completed. The inaugural match was played on September 7 of that year, when Rio Branco beat Guarapari EC 3-2. The first goal of the stadium was scored by Rio Branco's Arildo Ratão.

The stadium's attendance record currently stands at 32,328, set on September 21, 1986 when Rio Branco beat Vasco da Gama in a match for the Brazilian championship 1-0. Some people say, that actually about 50,000 were in the stadium.

It was sold to the Espírito Santo State Government in 2008.

2014 World Cup
The stadium was used by the Cameroon national team to train before and during the 2014 World Cup.

2019 U-17 World Cup
It is used as one of the four venues of the 2019 FIFA U-17 World Cup.

References

Enciclopédia do Futebol Brasileiro, Volume 2 - Lance, Rio de Janeiro: Aretê Editorial S/A, 2001.

External links
Templos do Futebol
Rio Branco's Official Website

Kleber Andrade
Rio Branco Atlético Clube